Manulea fuscodorsalis is a moth of the family Erebidae. It is found in Taiwan and Japan.

The wingspan is about 30 mm. The wings are greyish white, with a yellowish tinge. The forewings with a silky lustre, at the extreme base of the costa narrowly fuscous. The hindwings are opaque, and paler than the forewings, at the costa broadly ashy grey.

References

Moths described in 1930
Lithosiina
Moths of Japan